Sydney-King was an electoral district of the Legislative Assembly in the Australian state of New South Wales, created in 1894 in central Sydney from part of the electoral district of East Sydney and named after Governor King. It was initially east of George Street, north of Liverpool Street and Oxford Street and west of Riley Street. It also included Lord Howe Island. In 1904, its name was changed to King.

Members for King

Election results

References 

Former electoral districts of New South Wales
Constituencies established in 1894
1894 establishments in Australia
Constituencies disestablished in 1901
1904 disestablishments in Australia